WAYK (105.9 FM) is an American contemporary Christian music station in the Louisville, Kentucky, metropolitan area. It is a WAY-FM Network owned-and-operated station.

105.9 FM was initially a construction permit with the call letters WVSL in 1991. On September 1, 1993, it officially signed on with an active rock format as "QMF Too," in reference to then-sister station WQMF (105.9 changed to the WQNF call letters). In July 1995, the station shifted to modern rock, rebranded as "Q105.9", and changed call letters to WXNU. On September 13, 1996, it flipped to Modern AC as "Hits 105.9." This was short-lived; in 1997, WRVI and its Rock AC format moved from 94.7 FM to 105.9. The format would later shift to all-80s hits. In August 1999, after the station was sold to Salem, it flipped to Contemporary Christian, while retaining the "River" branding.

Prior to 2008, the station was "105.9 The River" owned by Salem Communications.

On May 2, 2011, the then-WSYI rebranded as "Shine 105.9". The station changed its call sign to the current WAYK on December 19, 2013.

References

External links
Shine 105.9  - Official Site

AYK
Contemporary Christian radio stations in the United States
WAY-FM Network
Radio stations established in 1986
1986 establishments in Kentucky
AYK